The 2023 Chicago Sky season will be the franchise's 18th season in the Women's National Basketball Association, and their fifth season under head coach James Wade. In the offseason, the team saw the departures of several key players in free agency including Candace Parker, Courtney Vandersloot, Allie Quigley, and Azurá Stevens.

The Women’s National Basketball Association today announced that the first WNBA Canada Game would feature the Minnesota Lynx and the Sky on Saturday, May 13, 2023, at Scotiabank Arena in Toronto, ON. This would be the first-ever WNBA preseason game in Canada.

Transactions

WNBA Draft

Transactions

Roster Changes

Additions

Subtractions

Roster

Schedule

Preseason

|- 
| 1
| May 13
| Minnesota
| 
| 
| 
| 
| Scotiabank Arena
| 
|-

Regular Season

|- 
| 1
| May 19
| @ Minnesota
| 
| 
| 
| 
| Target Center
| 
|- 
| 2
| May 21
| @ Phoenix
| 
| 
| 
| 
| Footprint Center
| 
|- 
| 3
| May 26
| Washington
| 
| 
| 
| 
| Wintrust Arena
| 
|- 
| 4
| May 28
| Dallas
| 
| 
| 
| 
| Wintrust Arena
| 
|- 
| 5
| May 30
| @ Atlanta
| 
| 
| 
| 
| Gateway Center Arena
| 

|- 
| 6
| June 2
| New York
| 
| 
| 
| 
| Wintrust Arena
| 
|- 
| 7
| June 4
| @ New York
| 
| 
| 
| 
| Barclays Center
| 
|- 
| 8
| June 6
| Indiana
| 
| 
| 
| 
| Wintrust Arena
| 
|- 
| 9
| June 9
| @ Los Angeles
| 
| 
| 
| 
| Crypto.com Arena
| 
|- 
| 10
| June 11
| @ Las Vegas
| 
| 
| 
| 
| Michelob Ultra Arena
| 
|- 
| 11
| June 15
| Indiana
| 
| 
| 
| 
| Wintrust Arena
| 
|- 
| 12
| June 18
| @ Washington
| 
| 
| 
| 
| Entertainment and Sports Arena
| 
|- 
| 13
| June 22
| Washington
| 
| 
| 
| 
| Wintrust Arena
|
|- 
| 14
| June 25
| @ Connecticut
| 
| 
| 
| 
| Mohegan Sun Arena
| 
|- 
| 15
| June 28
| Los Angeles
| 
| 
| 
| 
| Wintrust Arena
| 
|- 
| 16
| June 30
| Los Angeles
| 
| 
| 
| 
| Wintrust Arena
| 

|- 
| 17
| July 2
| @ Indiana
| 
| 
| 
| 
| Gainbridge Fieldhouse
|
|- 
| 18
| July 7
| Atlanta
| 
| 
| 
| 
| Wintrust Arena
| 
|- 
| 19
| July 9
| Atlanta
| 
| 
| 
| 
| Wintrust Arena
|
|- 
| 20
| July 12
| Connecticut
| 
| 
| 
| 
| Wintrust Arena
|
|- 
| 21
| July 20
| @ Phoenix
| 
| 
| 
| 
| Footprint Center
|
|- 
| 22
| July 22
| @ Seattle
| 
| 
| 
| 
| Climate Pledge Arena
|
|- 
| 23
| July 25
| Las Vegas
| 
| 
| 
| 
| Wintrust Arena
|
|- 
| 24
| July 28
| Seattle
| 
| 
| 
| 
| Wintrust Arena
|
|- 
| 25
| July 30
| Phoenix
| 
| 
| 
| 
| Wintrust Arena
|

|- 
| 26
| August 4
| @ Dallas
| 
| 
| 
| 
| College Park Center
|
|- 
| 27
| August 6
| @ Dallas
| 
| 
| 
| 
| College Park Center
|
|- 
| 28
| August 8
| Minnesota
| 
| 
| 
| 
| Wintrust Arena
|
|- 
| 29
| August 11
| New York
| 
| 
| 
| 
| Wintrust Arena
|
|- 
| 30
| August 13
| @ Washington
| 
| 
| 
| 
| Entertainment and Sports Arena
|
|- 
| 31
| August 18
| @ Atlanta
| 
| 
| 
| 
| Gateway Center Arena
|
|- 
| 32
| August 20
| Connecticut
| 
| 
| 
| 
| Wintrust Arena
|
|- 
| 33
| August 22
| Seattle
| 
| 
| 
| 
| Wintrust Arena
|
|- 
| 34
| August 24
| Las Vegas
| 
| 
| 
| 
| Wintrust Arena
|
|- 
| 35
| August 27
| @ Seattle
| 
| 
| 
| 
| Climate Pledge Arena
|
|- 
| 36
| August 29
| @ Los Angeles
| 
| 
| 
| 
| Crypto.com Arena
|

|- 
| 37
| September 3
| New York
| 
| 
| 
| 
| Wintrust Arena
|
|- 
| 38
| September 5
| @ Indiana
| 
| 
| 
| 
| Gainbridge Fieldhouse
|
|- 
| 39
| September 8
| Minnesota
| 
| 
| 
| 
| Wintrust Arena
|
|- 
| 40
| September 10
| @ Connecticut
| 
| 
| 
| 
| Mohegan Sun Arena
|
|-

Standings

Statistics

Regular Season

Awards and Honors

References

External links 

 The Official Site of the Chicago Sky

Chicago Sky
Chicago Sky seasons
Chicago Sky